Hafiz Mir Jalal oghlu Pashayev (born May 2, 1941) is the Deputy Minister of Foreign Affairs of the Republic of Azerbaijan and the founding rector of the ADA University. He holds the Doctor of Sciences degree in Physics and was the ambassador of the Republic of Azerbaijan to the United States until 2006.

Early life
Hafiz Pashayev was born in Baku, Azerbaijan on May 2, 1941. He obtained his undergraduate degree in Physics from the Azerbaijan State University in 1963. After graduation, he started to work at the Physics Institute of the Azerbaijan National Academy of Sciences until 1967. In 1971, he obtained the Candidate of Sciences degree at the I. V. Kurchatov Institute of Atomic Energy in Moscow. In 1975–1976, he continued the investigations at the University of California, Irvine. Finally, he obtained the Doctor of Sciences degree in 1984. From 1971 to 1992, Pashayev worked as a researcher and a laboratory chief at the Physics Institute of the Azerbaijan National Academy of Sciences.

Political career
Hafiz Pashayev started his political career in 1993 as Azerbaijan's first Ambassador Extraordinary and Plenipotentiary to the United States (also accredited in Canada and Mexico). He kept that position until 2006, when he was appointed the Deputy Minister of Foreign Affairs of the Azerbaijan Republic. Pashayev's name is associated with the Azerbaijan Diplomatic Academy established under the Ministry of Foreign Affairs of Azerbaijan Republic. He is the founding rector of the Academy, which in 2016 received the status of university to become ADA University. Moreover, Hafiz Pashayev is the author of more than 100 scientific works and 2 monographs, as well as the articles on various socio-political issues in the local and international media. He was awarded with the For service to the Fatherland Order of Azerbaijan by the President Ilham Aliyev in July 2019.

Personal life
Hafiz Pashayev is married, he has two children and four grandchildren. Other than his native language - Azerbaijani, he speaks fluent English and Russian. He is the son of the well-known writer and literary critic, Mir Jalal Pashayev and the uncle of the Azerbaijan's current First Lady, Mehriban Aliyeva.

References

External links

Ministry of Foreign Affairs of the Republic of Azerbaijan

1941 births
Diplomats from Baku
Ambassadors of Azerbaijan to the United States
Azerbaijani academics
Living people
Baku State University alumni